Leisure Village East is an unincorporated community and census-designated place (CDP) located within Lakewood Township, in Ocean County, New Jersey, United States. As of the 2010 United States Census, the CDP's population was 4,217. Leisure Village East is one of several active adult communities bearing similar names. Leisure Village and Leisure Village West are the other two communities nearby.

Geography
According to the United States Census Bureau, the CDP had a total area of 1.497 square miles (3.876 km2), including 1.487 square miles (3.851 km2) of land and 0.010 square miles (0.025 km2) of water (0.65%).

Demographics

Census 2010

Census 2000
As of the 2000 United States Census there were 4,597 people, 2,826 households, and 1,574 families living in the CDP. The population density was 1,109.3/km2 (2,880.7/mi2). There were 3,035 housing units at an average density of 732.4/km2 (1,901.9/mi2). The racial makeup of the CDP was 99.22% White, 0.33% African American, 0.17% Asian, 0.02% from other races, and 0.26% from two or more races. Hispanic or Latino of any race were 1.07% of the population.

There were 2,826 households, out of which 0.2% had children under the age of 18 living with them, 51.6% were married couples living together, 3.6% had a female householder with no husband present, and 44.3% were non-families. 41.5% of all households were made up of individuals, and 35.5% had someone living alone who was 65 years of age or older. The average household size was 1.63 and the average family size was 2.07.

In the CDP the population was spread out, with 0.3% under the age of 18, 0.6% from 18 to 24, 2.3% from 25 to 44, 22.1% from 45 to 64, and 74.8% who were 65 years of age or older. The median age was 71 years. For every 100 females, there were 66.7 males. For every 100 females age 18 and over, there were 66.8 males.

The median income for a household in the CDP was $34,402, and the median income for a family was $50,510. Males had a median income of $50,833 versus $32,574 for females. The per capita income for the CDP was $28,879. About 0.5% of families and 2.2% of the population were below the poverty line, including none of those under age 18 and 2.7% of those age 65 or over.

References

Census-designated places in Ocean County, New Jersey
Lakewood Township, New Jersey